Constance Mary Hart, Baroness Hart of South Lanark,  (née Ridehalgh; 18 September 19247 December 1991), also known as Dame Judith Hart, was a British Labour Party politician. She served as a Member of Parliament for 28 years, from 1959 to 1987. She served as a government minister during the 1960s and 1970s before entering the House of Lords in 1988.

Early life and education
Hart was born on 18 September 1924 in Burnley, Lancashire, England. Her mother died when she was eleven years old; a year later, she adopted the name Judith on a train to London. She was educated at Clitheroe Royal Grammar School, the London School of Economics and the University of London.

Political career
After joining the Labour Party aged 18, Hart was unsuccessful Labour candidate for Bournemouth West in 1951. She stood again in Aberdeen South in 1955 in "The Battle of the Housewives" but lost to Lady Tweedsmuir. She was elected as member for Lanark in 1959, winning by 700 votes after she arranged postal votes for displaced miners. She held the seat until 1983. Thereafter she sat for Clydesdale until 1987.

She held ministerial office as joint Parliamentary Under-Secretary of State for Scotland from 1964 to 1966, Minister of State, Commonwealth Office (1966–1967), Minister of Social Security (1967–68), Paymaster-General (with a seat in the Cabinet) from 1968 to 1969, and as Minister of Overseas Development from 1969 to 1970, 1974 to 1975 (when she resigned) and 1977 to 1979. In so doing, she became the fifth woman to have been included in a government cabinet in the history of Britain. She was also the first female Paymaster-General in Britain.

In opposition, Hart was frontbench spokesman on overseas aid from 1970 to 1974 and 1979 to 1980. Her views were often controversial and in 1972 she was mailed a bomb over her controversial work with the Labour Party's Southern African Liberation Fund. In 1974, when Labour returned to power, Hart was nearly passed over for a ministerial post due to her and her husband's connections to communism. Prime Minister Harold Wilson eventually decided to appoint her as Minister of Overseas Development, but she was never again appointed to Cabinet due to security concerns.

A trained sociologist, Hart frequently spoke and wrote on international development. She wrote several books, including Aid and Liberation: A Socialist Study of Aid Politics, which she published in 1973. In 1979, Hart developed a plan to redistribute British aid to prioritise the poorest countries, but Wilson disagreed with her approach, as it conflicted with diplomatic and trade priorities. He attempted to demote her to a post in the Department for Transport; Hart resigned in protest.

She was Co-Chairman of the Women's National Commission (appointed by the government) from 1969 to 1970. Within the Labour Party she was a member of the National Executive Committee from 1969 to 1983, serving as Vice-Chairman in 1980–81, and as Chairman in 1981–82. She was appointed a Privy Counsellor in 1967, and appointed a DBE in 1979.

On 8 February 1988, she was created a life peer, as Baroness Hart of South Lanark, of Lanark in the County of Lanark.

Personal life 
She met her husband, Dr Anthony Bernard Hart (always known as Tony), at an Association of Scientific Workers meeting. They married in 1946 and had two sons. He was also politically active, but when they were both selected as candidates for the Labour party in 1959, he withdrew his candidacy to support her campaign.

The family relocated to London in 1961 to allow Hart more family time. When Hart was appointed Minister of State for Commonwealth Affairs in 1966, her mother-in-law moved in to help with the children.

According to her son, Hart was a functional alcoholic and smoked 60 cigarettes a day.

Death
She died of bone cancer at the Queen Mary's Hospital, Roehampton, London, in 1991, aged 67.

Titles and honours
 Miss Judith Ridehalgh (1936–1946)
 Mrs Judith Hart (1946–1959)
 Judith Hart MP (1959–1967)
 The Rt. Hon. Judith Hart MP (1967–1979)
 The Rt. Hon. Dame Judith Hart DBE MP (1979–1988)
 The Rt. Hon. The Baroness Hart of South Lanark DBE PC (1988–1991)

References

Sources

External links
 

1924 births
1991 deaths
Deaths from cancer in England
Members of the Parliament of the United Kingdom for Scottish constituencies
Scottish Labour MPs
Female members of the Parliament of the United Kingdom for Scottish constituencies
United Kingdom Paymasters General
Hart, Judith
Dames Commander of the Order of the British Empire
Alumni of the London School of Economics
Life peeresses created by Elizabeth II
Labour Party (UK) life peers
People from Burnley
People from Lanark
UK MPs 1959–1964
UK MPs 1964–1966
UK MPs 1966–1970
UK MPs 1970–1974
UK MPs 1974
UK MPs 1974–1979
UK MPs 1979–1983
UK MPs 1983–1987
Female members of the Cabinet of the United Kingdom
People educated at Clitheroe Royal Grammar School
Chairs of the Labour Party (UK)
20th-century Scottish women politicians
20th-century Scottish politicians
Ministers in the Wilson governments, 1964–1970